Kyocera Communications, Inc. (pronounced "key-yo-sarah") is an American manufacturer of mobile phones for wireless service providers in the United States and Canada. Kyocera Communications, Inc. is a wholly owned subsidiary of Kyocera Corporation, which also manufactures mobile phones for the Japanese wireless market under various brands.

History

KWC was originally formed in February 2000 when Kyocera acquired Qualcomm's San Diego, California-based terrestrial handset division. Upon the purchase of Qualcomm's business unit, Kyocera formed Kyocera Wireless Corp. (KWC).

In 2003, Kyocera Wireless India (KWI), based in Bangalore, was established as a fully owned subsidiary of KWC, expanding KWC's reach into India's CDMA markets. However, in September 2009, KWC sold KWI to Mindtree Ltd. of Bangalore, India.

In 2008, Kyocera Corp. acquired the mobile phone division of Sanyo Electric Co., Ltd. for $375 million, making them the world's sixth-largest cell phone company. On April 1, 2008, they took the North American assets of Sanyo and created Kyocera Sanyo Telecom, Inc. (KSTI). They also announced that they were entering the GSM handset market, with a focus on the Latin American market. Kyocera continued selling Sanyo-branded phones throughout 2010.

On April 1, 2009, Kyocera announced the integration of KWC and KSTI, creating a new, consolidated division called Kyocera Communications, Inc. (KCI), with the headquarters remaining in their San Diego location. KCI remains one of North America's larger handset manufacturers, providing products to multiple wireless carriers including Boost Mobile, Cricket Wireless, MetroPCS, Public Mobile, Sprint Corporation, T-Mobile US, U.S. Cellular, Verizon Wireless, and Virgin Mobile USA.

In October 2011, Sprint began offering Kyocera's Dura Series, an exclusive line of rugged phones manufactured by Kyocera Communications using Sprint's new CDMA-based Push to talk service Sprint Direct Connect.

In August 2014, Kyocera released the Kyocera Brigadier, the first U.S. smartphone to be equipped with a display made of sapphire glass. This technology was carried over to the Verizon-distributed versions of the Duraforce Pro (announced August 2016, South Korea name Kyocera Torque) and the Duraforce Pro 2 (announced November 2018).

External links
 Kyocera Communications, Inc.
 Dura Series by Kyocera
 Kyocera Group Global Website

References

Kyocera
Mobile phone manufacturers
Electronics companies established in 2008
American companies established in 2008
Companies based in San Diego
Mobile phone companies of the United States